The 1954 Open Championship was held at the Lansdowne Club in London from 24 March - 29 March. Hashim Khan won his fourth consecutive title defeating his younger brother Azam Khan in the final.

Seeds

Results

+ amateur
^ seeded

References

Men's British Open Squash Championships
Men's British Open Championship
Men's British Open Squash Championship
Men's British Open Squash Championship
Squash competitions in London